Idza Luhumyo (born 1993) is a Kenyan short story writer, whose work explores Kenyan coastal identities. In July 2020, Luhumyo was announced as the inaugural recipient of the Margaret Busby New Daughters of Africa Award. She was the winner of the 2021 Short Story Day Africa Prize with her story "Five Years Next Sunday", which also won the 2022 Caine Prize.

Life
Idza Luhumyo was born in Mombasa, Kenya, and holds a law degree from Nairobi University. She lives between Kilifi and Nairobi, and works as a screenwriter and copywriter. On 21 July 2020 it was announced that she was the first recipient of a scholarship enabled by the publication by Myriad Editions of Margaret Busby's 1919 anthology New Daughters of Africa and that Luhumyo would start postgraduate studies at SOAS University of London in autumn 2020, with accommodation provided by International Students House. Discussing her course, Luhumyo said: "My favourite thing about the MA Comparative Literature program is its interdisciplinarity. Sometimes I like to think of it as 'literature-without-borders meets critical theory,' which is just perfect."

Luhumyo is currently a student and Rose Fellow in the MFA Creative Writing program at Texas State University. 

Luhumyo's work has been published by Popula, Jalada Africa, The Writivism Anthology, Baphash Literary & Arts Quarterly, MaThoko's Books, Gordon Square Review, Amsterdam's ZAM Magazine, Short Story Day Africa, the New Internationalist, The Dark and African Arguments. Her work has been shortlisted for the Short Story Day Africa Prize, the Miles Morland Writing Scholarship, and the Gerald Kraak Award.

Luhumyo won the Short Story Day Africa Prize 2021 with "Five Years Next Sunday". In June 2022, the story was also announced on the shortlist for the Caine Prize, alongside stories by Joshua Chizoma, Nana-Ama Danquah, Hannah Giorgis and Billie McTernan. Luhumyo went on to become the winner, chosen out of 349 entries from 27 African countries. Chair of the Caine Prize judging panel Okey Ndibe described "Five Years Next Sunday" as an "incandescent" story, which used "exquisite language". Luhumyo is the fifth Kenyan writer to have been awarded the Caine Prize.

In December 2022, Luhumyo was listed by New African magazine as one of the "100 Most Influential Africans" of the year.

References

External links
 "In conversation with Margaret Busby OBE and Idza Luhumyo", ISH Alumni, 11 March 2021.
 "Q&As: Idza Luhumyo – AKO Caine Prize shortlist 2022", Africa In Words, 12 July 2022.
 Wadzanai Mhute, "Meet the Writers Shortlisted for the 2022 Caine Prize", Oprah Daily, 8 June 2022.
 James Murua, "Idza Luhumyo wins the Caine Prize 2022", 20 July 2022, via YouTube.
 "Kenyan wins Caine Prize for African Writing", Newsday, BBC, 19 July 2022.

1993 births
21st-century Kenyan women writers
Alumni of SOAS University of London
Caine Prize winners
Kenyan women writers
Kenyan writers
Living people
University of Nairobi alumni
Women short story writers